The Straits of Corfu or Corfu Channel is the narrow body of water along the coasts of Albania and Greece to the east, separating these two countries from the Greek island of Corfu on the west.  The channel is a passage from the Adriatic Sea on the north to the Ionian Sea that is used by shipping local to Albania and Greece to the ports of Saranda, Albania, and Igoumenitsa, Greece, and by local and tourist traffic in Albania and from the Greek mainland to Corfu, in addition to some international traffic from the Adriatic.

Corfu Channel Incident 

The Corfu Channel Incident refers to three separate incidents involving Royal Navy ships in the Straits of Corfu which took place in 1946, and it is considered an early episode of the Cold War. During the first incident, Royal Navy ships came under fire from Albanian fortifications. The second incident involved Royal Navy ships striking mines and the third incident occurred when the Royal Navy conducted mine-clearing operations in the Corfu Channel, but in Albanian territorial waters, and Albania complained about them to the United Nations. This series of incidents led to the Corfu Channel Case, where the United Kingdom brought a case against the People's Republic of Albania to the International Court of Justice. Because of the incidents, Britain, in 1946, broke off talks with Albania aimed at establishing diplomatic relations between the two countries. Diplomatic relations were only restored in 1991.

References

Corfu
Corfu
Corfu
Corfu
Albania–Greece border
International straits
Landforms of Corfu (regional unit)
Landforms of the Ionian Islands (region)
Albanian Ionian Sea Coast